Cutnall Green Halt was a railway station in Worcestershire, England, serving the nearby village of Hampton Lovett on the Oxford, Worcester and Wolverhampton Railway between Droitwich Spa and Hartlebury. It was opened in 1928, and closed in 1965. The main use of the halt was by the village schoolchildren, travelling to nearby Droitwich for their education.

References

Further reading

Disused railway stations in Worcestershire
Former Great Western Railway stations
Railway stations in Great Britain opened in 1928
Railway stations in Great Britain closed in 1965
Beeching closures in England